Philippides (Ancient Greek: Φιλιππίδης) was an Athenian poet of the Greek New Comedy. He was the son of Philokles of Kephale and was active during the 111th Olympiad (c. 336-333 BCE). Aulus Gellius records that he died at an advanced old age from the joy of an unexpected victory at a dramatic competition. He was a great personal friend (philos) of King Lysimachus (i.e. "successor" of Alexander the Great ) Philippides is reported as having had great influence with Lysimachus. In 285 BC Athens passed a decree to honor Philippides for his continuous requests to Lysimachus for aid to recover Piraeus and the forts. In 286/285 BC Philippides was elected agonothetes.

Surviving titles and fragments
The Suda reports that Philippides produced 45 plays. Only the titles of 16 plays (along with associated fragments) have survived.

 Adoniazousai (Women Mourning for Adonis)
 Amphiaraos (Amphiaraus)
 Ananeosis (Renewal)
 Argyrioi Aphanismos (Disappearance of the Money)
 Auloi (Flutes)
 Basanizomene (Woman Being Tortured)
 Lakiadai (Laciadae)
 Mastropos (The Pimp)
 Olynthia (Woman from Olynthos)
 Sympleousai (Woman Sailing Together) or Synekpleousai (Women Sailing Forth Together)
 Philadelphoi (The Brother-Loving Men)
 Philathenaios (Lover of Athens)
 Philargyros (Lover of Money)
 Philarkhos (Philarchus)
 Phileuripides (The Euripides-Lover)
 Triodoi, or Rhopopoles

References
 

Ancient Greek dramatists and playwrights
Greek poets
New Comic poets
4th-century BC poets